Only Life is the third album by the American rock band the Feelies, released in 1988. It was made with the same line-up that appeared on the band's previous album, The Good Earth. The album contains a cover of the Velvet Underground's "What Goes On". 

The album peaked at No. 173 on the Billboard 200. Jonathan Demme directed the video for "Away".

Production
The album was produced by Glenn Mercer, Bill Million, and Steve Rinkoff.

Critical reception
Magnet wrote that "the songs grapple with apprehension and the longing for comfort, which the music delivers in the form of indelible hooks and transcendent rave-ups." Rolling Stone wrote: "Driven by the interlocking guitars of Mercer and Bill Million, the band constructs waves of beautiful hypnotic drone, with subtle tempo shifts and percussion accents that ripple through the arrangements." Trouser Press praised the "amazingly exacting sound and performances" and "riveting songs of breathless electricity." USA Today listed the album at number nine on its list of the ten best albums of 1988.

Track listing

Personnel
 Glenn Mercer – guitars, vocals
 Bill Million – guitars, vocals
 Dave Weckerman – percussion
 Brenda Sauter – bass
 Stan Demeski – drums

References

The Feelies albums
1988 albums
A&M Records albums